Aperol is an Italian bitter apéritif made of gentian, rhubarb and cinchona, among other ingredients. It has a vibrant orange hue. Its name comes from apero, a French slang word for apéritif.

History
Aperol was originally created in 1919 by Luigi and Silvio Barbieri  after seven years of experimentation. It did not become widely popular until after World War II. It was first produced by the Barbieri company, based in Padua, but is now produced by the Campari Group. Although it tastes and smells much like Campari, Aperol has an alcohol content of 11%—less than half that of Campari. They have the same sugar content, and Aperol is less bitter in taste. Campari is also much darker in color.

Aperol sold in Germany had an alcohol content of 15% for some time to avoid German container deposit legislation regulations, but since 2021, it has been sold with an alcohol content of 11%.

Mix variants 

The Spritz, an aperitif cocktail, is often made using Aperol. The result is known as the Aperol Spritz. Another variant is the Aperol Sour.

Sponsorship
Since April 2010, Aperol has been the official sponsor of Moto GP, the Grand Prix of Motorcycle racing.

Aperol had a partnership with Manchester United as the club's official global spirits partner from January 2014 until the end of the 2016/2017 season.

See also
 Cinzano
 Cynar
 Fernet
 Select

References

External links

Campari Group
Italian liqueurs
Products introduced in 1919